Louis Ralph (born Ludwig Josef Musik; 17 August 1878 – September 1952) was an Austrian film actor and director.

He was born Ludwig Musik in Graz, Styria, Austria-Hungary (now Austria), and died in Berlin at age 68.

Selected filmography
 Die Vila der Narenta (1919)
 Der Schatzgräber von Blagaj (1919)
 Diamonds (1920)
 Lady Hamilton (1921)
 The Golden Plague (1921)
 The Lodging House for Gentleman (1922)
 The Inheritance (1922)
 The Unknown Tomorrow (1923)
 The Green Manuela (1923)
 The Love of a Queen (1923)
 The Final Mask (1924)
 The Voice of the Heart (1924)
 Tragedy in the House of Habsburg (1924)
 Orient (1924)
 The Humble Man and the Chanteuse (1925)
 The Elegant Bunch (1925)
 Our Emden (1926)
 The Circus of Life (1926)
 The Queen Was in the Parlour (1927)
 Ghost Train (1927)
 Alpine Tragedy (1927)
 The Little Slave (1928)
  Escape from Hell (1928)
 Casanova's Legacy (1928)
 Alraune (1928)
 Spione (1928)
 Cyanide (1930)
 Road to Rio (1931)
 The Virtuous Sinner (1931)
 Cruiser Emden (1932)
 Grandstand for General Staff (1932)
 Decoy (1934)
 My Heart Calls You (1934)
 Artisten (1935)
 The Deruga Case (1938)
 Congo Express (1939)
 The Thing About Styx (1942)
 Die goldene Stadt (1942)
 I pagliacci (1943)

References

External links

1878 births
1952 deaths
Actors from Graz
Austrian male film actors
Austrian male silent film actors
Austrian film directors
20th-century Austrian male actors
Film people from Graz